Gimlé is a place in Norse mythology.

Gimle may also refer to:


People
Trude Gimle (born 1974), a Norwegian alpine skier

Places
Gimle, Oslo, a neighborhood in the city of Oslo, Norway
Gimle (Kristiansand), a neighborhood in the city of Kristiansand, Norway
Gimle, Frederiksberg, a former community centre in Frederiksberg, Denmark
The name Vidkun Quisling gave to his Villa Grande estate in Bygdøy, Norway
A school, church, and cemetery in Albright, Alberta, Canada

See also 
 Gimli (disambiguation)